The Dutch Eerste Divisie in the 1974–75 season was contested by 19 teams, one team less than in the previous year. This was due to the absorption of Volewijckers by eredivisie-club FC Amsterdam. NEC Nijmegen won the championship.

New entrants
Relegated from the 1973–74 Eredivisie
 FC Groningen
 NEC Nijmegen
Fortuna Vlaardingen changed their name to FC Vlaardingen for this season.

League standings

Promotion competition
In the promotion competition, four period winners (the best teams during each of the four quarters of the regular competition) played for promotion to the Eredivisie.

See also
 1974–75 Eredivisie
 1974–75 KNVB Cup

References
Netherlands - List of final tables (RSSSF)

Eerste Divisie seasons
2
Neth